The Men's heptathlon event  at the 2002 European Athletics Indoor Championships was held on March 2–3.

Results

References
Results

Combined events at the European Athletics Indoor Championships
Heptathlon